Kistarcsa is a town in Pest County, Budapest metropolitan area, Hungary.

A site of the Kistarcsa concentration camp during the Holocaust. Later an internment camp of State Protection Authority for political prisoners during the 1950s.

History 
Only a few archaeological excavations were held on the territory of Kistarcsa; the earliest findings are from the Neolithic Era (4000–2500 BC). From this time it was always a populated area: Celts, Vandals, Alans, Sarmatas and Avars lived here. After the fall of the Avar Empire the Magyars found an underpopulated area, so they could settle down easily. Their settlement can be dated back to the 10th to 13th centuries according to the excavated area next to the cemetery of Kistarcsa.

Notable people
Bernadett Baczkó, judoka
Jane Haining, Scottish Church of Scotland missionary
László Háry, major general, aviator and a Commander of the First Independent Hungarian Air Force
Zoltán Meszlényi, martyr bishop
József Simándy, tenor
Lajos von Sipeki-von Balás, modern pentathlete
Krisztina Szádvári, handballer

Twin towns – sister cities

Kistarcsa is twinned with:
 Beluša, Slovakia
 Fanchykovo, Ukraine
 Milovice, Czech Republic
 Radomyśl nad Sanem, Poland
 Turia, Romania

External links

 in Hungarian

References

Populated places in Pest County